Acropora hoeksemai is a species of acroporid coral that was first described by Dr. Carden Wallace in 1997. It is listed as a vulnerable species on the IUCN Red List, and has a decreasing population. It is common, listed on Appendix II of CITES, and is found over a large range.

Description
It is a light brown, white, or cream colour, and the branch ends are upturned, except on the outside of the structure. These branches are not regular, and contain both axial and radial corallites. Radial corallites are tube-shaped, neat, orderly, and they are the same sizes. They contain basic spinules. It reaches maturity at between three and eight years, and it is believed to survive for more than ten years. It is composed of aragonite (calcium carbonate). A. hoeksemai looks similar to Acropora valenciennesi and species of the Acropora divaricata group.

Distribution
Acropora hoeksemai is a common species and found over a large range; the Solomans, the Indo-Pacific oceans, Papua New Guinea, Okinawa, Southeast Asia, and Thailand. It is native to Australia, Indonesia (found in five regions), Malaysia, Japan, Papua New Guinea, Singapore, Thailand, the Philippines, and the Solomon Islands. There is no specific population for the coral, but numbers are known to be decreasing. It is easily damaged by disease and bleaching, and is also threatened by being prey to starfish Acanthaster planci, climate change, temperature rises, fishing, infrastructure, and other human activities. Some species could be found in Marine Protected Areas. It is listed as vulnerable on the IUCN Red List, and also appears on CITES Appendix II.

Taxonomy
It was first described by C.C. Wallace in 1997 as Acropora hoeksemai in Indonesia.

References

Acropora
Animals described in 1997
Vulnerable animals